Doon International School, Palia Kalan, Tehra, Nighasan Road, Palia Kalan, is a senior secondary school, recognized by the CBSE Board, New Delhi. It offers day and residential facilities. The school was founded by Mr. Jagat Chaudhary in 1989 as the first English medium school in Palia Kalan.

External links

  at Facebook
 Doon International School at Education Mirror
Doon International School at KheriHub

International schools in India
High schools and secondary schools in Uttar Pradesh
Lakhimpur Kheri district
Educational institutions established in 1989
1989 establishments in Delhi